This is a list of New Zealand musicians of any genre.

See also the categories:
 New Zealand musical groups
 New Zealand musicians
 New Zealand songwriters

0-9 
1814
3 The Hard Way – hip-hop band; "Hip Hop Holiday" (1994) reached #1
The 3Ds
48May
8 Foot Sativa

A 
Aaradhna
Able Tasmans
Chris Abrahams
Richard Adams
Adeaze
Rudy Adrian
Age Pryor
The Fan Club
Bruce Aitken
Alien Weaponry
Steve Allen
Anderson and Wise
Annah Mac
Antagonist A.D.
Ardijah
Atlas
Autozamm
Avalanche City

B
Bailter Space
Bang Bang Eche
Christopher Banks
The Bats
Beastwars
Daniel Bedingfield
Benee
Betchadupa
The Beths
Carly Binding
Birchville Cat Motel
Bird Nest Roys
Black River Drive
The Black Seeds
Blacklistt
Ginny Blackmore – singer, songwriter
Blam Blam Blam
Bleeders
Blerta
Blindspott
Jack Body – composer
Kevin Borich
Boyband
John Christopher Bradshaw
Graham Brazier
Breaks Co-Op
Breathe
Jonathan Bree
Bressa Creeting Cake
Bridgette Allen
Broods
The Brunettes
Rosina Buckman – opera singer
Richard James Burgess – drummer
Bulldogs Allstar Goodtime Band

C
The Cakekitchen
Edwin Carr
Shayne Carter
Cassandra's Ears
Che Fu
The Checks
The Chicks
The Chills
Clap Clap Riot
Jemaine Clement – member of folk/pop/comedy duo Flight of the Conchords
Darcy Clay
The Clean
Chanel Cole
Coconut Rough
Confessor
Ray Columbus – Invaders singer, TV presenter
Concord Dawn
Ashley Cooper
Crowded House
Annie Crummer
Cut Off Your Hands

D
The D4
David Dallas
Maria Dallas
Dam Native
Dance Exponents
The Datsuns
Mark de Clive-Lowe
Julia Deans
Delaney Davidson
Dawn of Azazel
DD Smash
Leo De Castro
The Dead C
Dead Famous People
Deep Obsession
Dei Hamo
Deja Voodoo
Demoniac
Devilskin
Johnny Devlin
Lynette Diaz
Die! Die! Die!
Dimmer
Bill Direen (Bilderine)
Disasteradio
DLT (Darryl Thomson)
Dave Dobbyn – singer, songwriter
The DoubleHappys
Graeme Downes
Dr Kevorkian & the Suicide Machine
Dragon
Drax Project 
Dribbling Darts
Will Druzianic - Plays 5 different instruments
Brooke Duff
The Dukes

E
Electric Confectionaires
Elemeno P
The Enemy
The Enright House
Evermore
The Exponents
Eye TV

F
Andrew Fagan
The Fan Club
David Farquhar – composer
Fast Crew
Fat Freddy's Drop
Annabel Fay
Fazerdaze
The Feelers
Liam Finn
Neil Finn – singer, songwriter
Tim Finn – singer, songwriter
Flight of the Conchords
Fly My Pretties
Foamy Ed
The Fourmyula
Brooke Fraser
Fred Dagg (John Clarke)
From Scratch
The Front Lawn
Frontline
Ruby Frost
Fur Patrol
Futurians

G
Garageland
Steve Gilpin
Golden Harvest
Goldenhorse
Goodnight Nurse
Goodshirt
GST

H
Nathan Haines
Ria Hall
Mika Haka
Hallelujah Picassos
Joan Hammond – violinist, soprano
Hammond Gamble
John Hanlon
Aldous Harding
Headband
Headless Chickens
Hello Sailor
Jan Hellriegel
George D. Henderson
Herbs
Herriot Row
Hieronymus Bosch
High Dependency Unit
Head Like A Hole
Hogsnort Rupert
Paul Holmes
Home Brew
Calum Hood – from Australian band 5 Seconds of Summer
Horomona Horo
House of Downtown
House of Shem
Howard Morrison Quartet
Al Hunter
Marc Hunter – singer (moved to Australia)
Human
Human Instinct
Luke Hurley

I
I Am Giant
In Dread Response
Ivy Lies

J
J.Williams (Joshua Williams) – singer, dancer
Jakob
Billy T. James
Mitch James
Jean-Paul Sartre Experience
Peter Jefferies
Jennie – singer and member of Blackpink (lived in New Zealand for some years)
Greg Johnson

K
K.One
Katchafire
KERI
Kerretta
Kids of 88
Kidz in Space
Alphonso Keil
Eliza Keil
Freddie Keil
Herma Keil
Olaf Keil
David Kilgour
Kimbra
Kimo
Ken Kincaid
King Kapisi
Knightshade
The Knobz
Chris Knox
Kora
Kraus

L
L.A.B.
The La De Das
Ladi6
Ladyhawke
Shona Laing
Larry's Rebels
Dinah Lee
Like A Storm
Douglas Lilburn – composer, educator
Jody Lloyd
Look Blue Go Purple
Lorde
Eddie Low
Low Profile
Jordan Luck
Luger Boa
Ben Lummis
Bruce Lynch
Suzanne Lynch

M
Tim Maddren
Malvina Major – opera singer
Moana Maree Maniapoto
Midge Marsden
Dennis Marsh
Elizabeth Marvelly
Massad
Renee Maurice- singer musical playwright
Ma-V-Elle
Ricky May
Dave McArtney
Jamie McDell
John McGough
Bret McKenzie – member of folk/pop/comedy duo Flight of the Conchords
Ryan McPhun and the Ruby Suns
Merekotia Amohau
Max Merritt
Metal Fusion
Midnight Youth
The Midnights
Mild Orange
Minuit
The Mint Chicks
Mi-Sex
Misfits of Science
Anika Moa
Moana and the Moahunters (also known as Moana and the Tribe)
Connan Mockasin 
The Mockers
Monte Video and the Cassettes
Roy Montgomery
Willy Moon
Moorhouse
Jenny Morris – singer, songwriter
Sir Howard Morrison – entertainer
Mother Goose
Motocade
Mt Eden (formerly Mt Eden Dubstep)
Mumsdollar
Muroki
Michael Murphy
The Mutton Birds

N
The Naked and Famous
The Narcs
Nash Chase
Oscar Natzka – opera singer
Tami Neilson
Nesian Mystik
Netherworld Dancing Toys
Ngaire
Mike Nock
Nocturnal Projections
Nurture

O
OMC
Sharon O'Neill
Simon O'Neill – opera singer
Openside
Opensouls
Opshop

P
 Pacifier – See Shihad
Emma Paki
Parachute Band
Rosy Parlane
Parmentier
Pātea Māori Club
Suzanne Paul
Payola
Peking Man
Abe Phillips
The Phoenix Foundation
Pitch Black
Pluto
P-Money
The Politicians
Pop Mechanix
Peter Posa
Suzanne Prentice
Anita Prime
Dalvanius Prime
Prince Tui Teka
Princess Chelsea
The Puddle
Push Push

R
The Rabble
The Radars
John Rae (musician)
Randa
Rapture Ruckus
Nadia Reid
The Renderers
Jordan Reyne
Don Richardson
The Rising Stars
RM – rapper and member of BTS (lived in New Zealand for 6 months)
Dean Roberts
Rosé – singer and member of Blackpink (was born and lived in New Zealand until at the age of 7)
John Rowles – singer
Rubicon
The Ruby Suns
Mike Rudd
Dane Rumble
The Rumour
Bic Runga
Bruce Russell

S
Salmonella Dub
Satellite Spies
Savage
Screaming Meemees
Craig Scott
Scribe
The Shadracks
Shapeshifter
Rhian Sheehan
Shihad – Also known as Pacifier
Shocking Pinks
Shoes This High
The Simple Image
Sinate
Sisters Underground
Six60
Skallander
The Skeptics
Slim
Smashproof
Snapper
Sneaky Feelings
Southside of Bombay
Space Waltz
Spacifix
Split Enz
Nigel Stanford
Stellar*
The Stereo Bus
Steriogram
Frankie Stevens
Jon Stevens
Straitjacket Fits
Strawpeople
Suburban Reptiles
Superette
Supergroove
Surf City
The Swingers

T
Tiki Taane
Tadpole
Tahuna Breaks
Tall Dwarfs
Dame Kiri Te Kanawa – opera singer
Inia Te Wiata – opera singer
Th' Dudes
This Kind of Punishment
The Tigers
Tiny Ruins
Benny Tipene
Aaron Tokona (Also known as AHoriBuzz)
Tomorrow People
Jon Toogood – lead singer of the band Shihad
Topp Twins
Toy Love
TrinityRoots
TrueBliss
Truth
The Tutts
TV2 Stars
Two Lane Blacktop

U
Ulcerate
Unity Pacific
Unknown Mortal Orchestra
Upper Hutt Posse
Keith Urban – singer
Margaret Urlich

V
Rosita Vai
Peter van der Fluit
The Veils
The Verlaines
Villainy
Voom

W
Miho Wada – jazz flautist and saxophonist, founder of Miho's Jazz Orchestra
Stan Walker
Bunny Walters
Dean Wareham – singer and guitarist with Galaxie 500, Luna and Dean & Britta
The Warratahs
Darren Watson
Waves
Hayley Westenra – singer
Weta
When the Cat's Away
Annie Whittle
Gin Wigmore
Pere Wihongi
Marlon Williams
Pixie Williams – singer
Martin Winch – guitarist
Working With Walt
Dion Workman
Wreck Small Speakers On Expensive Stereos

Y
The Yandall Sisters
Yulia
Yumi Zouma

Z
Zed
Zowie

References 

Lists of musicians by nationality
Musicians
 
Musicians